An electric fence is a barrier that uses electric shocks to deter people and/or other animals from crossing a boundary. The voltage of the shock may have effects ranging from discomfort to death. Most electric fences are used for agricultural fencing and other forms of non-human animal control, although they are also used to protect high-security areas such as military installations or prisons, where potentially-lethal voltages may be used. Virtual electric fences for livestock using GPS technology have also been developed.

Design and function 

Electric fences are designed to complete an electrical circuit when touched by an animal. A component called a power energizer converts power into a brief high voltage pulse. One terminal of the power energizer releases an electrical pulse along a connected bare wire about once per second. Another terminal is connected to a metal rod implanted in the earth, called a ground or earth rod. An animal touching both the wire and the earth during a pulse will complete an electrical circuit and will conduct the pulse, causing an electric shock. The effects of the shock depend upon the voltage, the energy of the pulse, the degree of contact between the recipient and the fence and ground and the route of the current through the body; it can range from barely noticeable to uncomfortable, painful or even lethal.

Fence energizers 
Early alternating current (AC) fence chargers used a transformer and a mechanically-driven switch to generate the electrical pulses. The pulses were wide and the voltage unpredictable, with no-load peaks in excess of 10,000 volts and a rapid drop in voltage as the fence leakage increased. The switch mechanism was prone to failure. Later systems replaced the switch with a solid-state circuit, with an improvement in longevity but no change in pulse width or voltage control.

"Weed burner" fence chargers were popular for a time and featured a longer-duration output pulse that would destroy weeds touching the fence. These were responsible for many grass fires when used during dry weather. Although still available, they have declined in popularity.

Most modern fences emit pulses of high voltage at a given interval of time, and do not take into account whether there is an animal touching the conductive wires, except for the voltage multiplier based electric fence charger that stores high voltage potential and dumps its charges as soon as a conductive load (grounded animal) touches the wires.

Depending on the area to be fenced and remoteness of its location, fence energizers may be hooked into a permanent electrical circuit or run by lead-acid or dry cell batteries or a smaller battery kept charged by a solar panel. The power consumption of a fence in good condition is low, and so a lead-acid battery powering several hundred metres of fence may last for several weeks on a single charge. For shorter periods, dry cell batteries may be used. Some energizers can be powered by more than one source.

Fencing materials 
Smooth steel wire is the material most often used for electric fences, ranging from a fine thin wire used as a single line to thicker, high-tensile (HT) wire. Less often, woven wire or barbed wire fences can be electrified, though such practices create a more hazardous fence, particularly if an animal becomes caught by the fencing material (electrified barbed wire is unlawful in some areas). Synthetic webbing and rope-like fencing materials woven with fine conducting wires (usually of stainless steel) have become available in the late 1990s and are particularly useful for areas requiring additional visibility or as temporary fencing.

The electrified fence itself must be kept insulated from the earth and from any materials that will conduct electricity and ignite or short out the fence. Fencing must therefore avoid vegetation, and cannot be attached directly to wood or metal posts. Typically, wooden or metal posts are driven into the ground and plastic or porcelain insulators are attached to them, or plastic posts are used. The conducting material is then attached to the posts.

Palisade fences 

Electrified palisade fences are usually made from painted mild steel, galvanized steel, stainless steel or aluminum.

Palisade electric fences are used in most countries, particularly where there is little vegetation to short-circuit the fence or where the costs of security personnel is high in relation to automated security equipment. The electric pulse is a strong deterrent for criminals, while the palisade fence is mechanically stronger than a typical steel cable electric fence, being able to withstand impact from wildlife, small falling trees and wildfires.

Due to the high levels of crime in South Africa, it is common for residential houses to have perimeter defenses.  The City of Johannesburg promotes the use of palisade fencing over opaque, usually brick, walls as criminals cannot hide as easily behind the fence.  The City of Johannesburg manual on safety describes best practices and maintenance of palisade fencing, such as not growing vegetation in front of palisades as this allows criminals to make an unseen breach.

Virtual electric fence 
In a virtual electric fence system each animal has a collar with a GPS unit which is set to produce first an audible warning and then a shock as the animal approaches a programmable boundary. Pet fences to control domestic dogs have been used since 1973, and the first system for livestock control was developed by Peck's Invisible Fence Co, now Invisible Fence Inc., in 1987. An early application involved goats and Euphorbia  esula.  Virtual fencing has been used by the Royal Society for the Protection of Birds in England to control grazing in wild and sensitive landscapes without the need for expensive and visually intrusive fencing. Companies which have developed this technology include the Norwegian Nofence, the Australian Agersens (brand name eShepherd) and the American Vence.

History 

First published in 1832, Chapter 7 of Domestic Manners of the Americans by Fanny Trollope describes an arrangement of wires connected with an electrical machine used to protect a display called "Dorfeuille's Hell" in the Western Museum of natural history in Cincinnati, which she herself invented. Published in 1870, Chapter 22 of Jules Verne's 20,000 Leagues Under the Sea, describes "The Lightning Bolts of Captain Nemo"the use of electrification of a structure as a defensive weapon. Published in 1889, Mark Twain's novel A Connecticut Yankee in King Arthur's Court, uses an electric fence for defensive purposes.

David H. Wilson obtained United States Patent 343,939 in 1886, combining protection, an alarm bell, and telephone communications. He constructed an experimental 30-mile electric fence energized by a water wheel in Texas in 1888, which proved successful at keeping cattle separated, but was deemed impractical as a business venture.

In 1905, the Russian army improvised electric fences during the Russo-Japanese War at Port Arthur. In 1915, during World War I, the German army installed the "Wire of Death", an electrified fences along the border between Belgium and the Netherlands to prevent unauthorized movement of people across the border. The fences covered 300 kilometres and consisted of several strands of copper wire, backed with barbed wire, and energized to several thousand volts. An estimated 3,000 human fatalities were caused by the fence, as well as the destruction of livestock.

Electric fences were used to control livestock in the United States in the early 1930s, and electric fencing technology developed in both the United States and New Zealand.

An early application of the electric fence for livestock control was developed in 1936–1937 by New Zealand inventor Bill Gallagher. Built from a car ignition trembler coil set, Gallagher used the device to keep his horse from scratching itself against his car. Gallagher later started the Gallagher Group to improve and market the design. In 1962, another New Zealand inventor, Doug Phillips, invented the non-shortable electric fence based on capacitor discharge. This significantly increased the range an electric fence could be used from a few hundred metres to 35 km (~20 miles), and reduced the cost of fencing by more than 80%. The non-shortable electric fence was patented by Phillips and by 1964 was manufactured by Plastic Products, a New Zealand firm, under the name "Waikato Electric Fence".  Since then, a variety of plastic insulators are now used on farms throughout the world.

By 1939, public safety concerns in the United States prompted Underwriters' Laboratories to publish a bulletin on electric shock from electric fences, leading to the ANSI/UL standard No. 69 for electric fence controllers.

In 1969 Robert B. Cox, a farmer in Adams County, Iowa, invented an improved electric fence bracket and was issued United States Patent No. 3,516,643 on 23 June 1970. This bracket improved electric fences by keeping the wire high enough above the ground and far enough away from the fence to permit grass and weeds growing beneath the wire to be mowed. The brackets attached to the posts by what may be called a "pivot bind" or "torsion-lock".  The weight of the bracket, the attached insulator and the electric wire attached to the insulator bind the bracket to the post.

Electric fences have improved significantly over the years. Improvements include:
 Polyethylene insulators replacing porcelain insulators, beginning in the 1960s. Polyethylene is much cheaper than porcelain and is less breakable.
 Improvements in electrical design of the fence energizer, often called a "charger" (USA) or "fencer" (UK).
 Changes in laws. In some jurisdictions, certain types of electrical outputs for fences were unlawful until the 1950s or 1960s. In other areas, signage requirements and other restrictions limited usability. Many US cities continue to have outdated laws prohibiting electric fences to prevent agricultural fences from entering the city. Houston in Texas for example, changed their ordinance that prohibited electric fencing in 2008.
 Introduction of high tensile (HT) steel fence wire in the 1970s in New Zealand and in the 1980s in the United States.
 Introduction of synthetic webbing and rope-like fencing materials woven with fine conducting wires.
 Design of moveable fence components, such as Tumblewheel, a moveable fence post used for making mobile one-wire fences for the purpose of rotational grazing. The insulated central hub enables the line to maintain power while the fence is being moved.

Uses

Agriculture 

Permanent electric fencing is used in many agricultural areas, as construction of electric fences can be much cheaper and faster than conventional fences (it uses plain wire and much lighter construction, as the fence does not need to physically restrain animals). The risk of injury to livestock (particularly horses) is lower compared to fences made of barbed wire or certain types of woven wire with large openings that can entangle the feet.

Its disadvantages include the potential for the entire fence to be disabled due to a break in the conducting wire, shorting out if the conducting wire contacts any non-electrified component that may make up the rest of the fence, power failure, or forced disconnection due to the risk of fires starting by dry vegetation touching an electrified wire. Other disadvantages can be lack of visibility and the potential to shock an animal passing by, who might accidentally touch or brush the fence.

Many fences are made entirely of standard smooth or high-tensile wire, although high quality synthetic fencing materials are also beginning to be used as part of permanent fences, particularly when visibility of the fence is a concern.

Conventional agricultural fencing of any type may be strengthened by the addition of a single electric line mounted on insulators attached to the top or front of the fence. A similar wire mounted close to the ground may be used to prevent pigs from excavating beneath other fencing. Substandard conventional fencing can also be made temporarily usable until proper repairs are made by the addition of a single electric line set on a "stand-off" insulator.

Electric materials are also used for the construction of temporary fencing, particularly to support the practice of managed intensive grazing (also known as rotational or "strip" grazing). It is also popular in some places for confining horses and pack animals overnight when trail riding, hunting, or at competitions such as endurance riding and competitive trail riding. Typically, one or more strands of wire, synthetic tape or cord are mounted on metal or plastic posts with stakes at the bottom, designed to be driven into the ground with the foot. For a hand-tightened temporary fence of electrified rope or web in a small area, these are usually spaced at no more than 12 to 15 feet (about four metres) to prevent the fencing material from sagging and touching the ground.  Larger areas where tools are used to stretch wire may be able to set step-in posts at larger distances without risk that the fencing material will sag.

With temporary electric fencing, a large area can be fenced off in a short period. Temporary fencing that is intended to be left in place for several weeks or months may be given additional support by the use of steel T posts (which are quickly driven in with hand tools and unearthed with relative ease, using a leverage device), to help keep the fence upright, particularly at corners. Livestock owners using rotational grazing in set patterns that are similar from one year to the next may permanently drive a few permanent wooden fence posts in strategic locations.

Portable fence energizers are made for temporary fencing, powered solely by batteries, or by a battery kept charged by a small solar panel. Rapid laying-out and removal of multiple-strand temporary electric fencing over a large area may be done using a set of reels mounted on a tractor or all-terrain vehicle.

For sheep, poultry, and other smaller animals, plastic electric netting may be mounted on insulating stakesthis is also effective at keeping out some predators such as foxes.

In practice, once most animals have learned of the unpleasant consequences of touching the fence they tend to avoid it for considerable periods even when it is inactive. However, some animals learn to avoid the shock, either by running under the fence quickly between pulses, or by pushing other individuals through the fence. Animals with thick woolly coats (such as sheep or highland cattle) may learn to push through the fence themselves, using their coats as electrical insulation. Some animals also learn to recognize the slight clicking sound made by some electric fences and thus can sense when the fence is off.

Wild animals 

Electric fences are useful for controlling the movements of wild animals. Examples include deterring deer from entering private property, keeping animals off airport runways, keeping wild boar from raiding crops, and preventing geese from soiling areas used by people. Electric fencing has been extensively used to reduce the conflict between elephants or other animals and humans in Africa and Asia. However, electric fences are increasingly used in small livestock farming as a management tool to exclude animals, such as potential predators, that will tunnel under these fences to gain entrance to livestock camps.  Electrified fences are also increasingly used on both domestic livestock and wildlife (game) farms in Africa as a management tool to exclude predators from entering or exiting a camp. A number of animal species, other than predators, may dig under these fences to cross that barrier.

The value of electrified fences is offset by lethal electric shock threats to a number of species, including vulnerable and endangered species such as African ground pangolin (Smutsia temminckii), Southern African python (Python natalensis), and a number of tortoise species.

In South Africa it is estimated that more than 31,500 reptiles (predominantly tortoises) are killed on electrified fences annually. The estimate for African ground pangolins killed by electric shock is 377–1,028 annually. The impacts of electrified fences on other species, such as monitor lizards (Varanus spp), have not been quantified.

Pangolins are bipedal, walking on their hind legs with their front legs and tail held off the ground, leaving their ventral surface unprotected. This makes them particularly prone to accidental lethal electric shock on electrified fences.  Depending on the electrified fence's design and height of the lower lines, the pangolin's head or exposed belly come into contact with the electrified wire(s). The initial shock will causes the pangolin to adopt its defense of rolling into a ball, often resulting in it inadvertently wrapping itself around the electrified wire.

An animal wrapped around the electric wire receives successive shocks, which in the case of pangolins results in them curling into an ever tighter ball around the live wire.  The repeated electrical pulses ultimately kill the pangolin. Those not killed outright usually succumb to exposure, dehydration or starvation.  Pangolins found dead on electric fences often have epidermal burnsthese sometimes burning through the scales. Internal injuries may also be significant. Pangolins found alive while wrapped around an electrified wire may suffer debilitating neurological damage if they have experienced prolonged exposure to the electric current. These ultimately succumb even when released.

Security

Non-lethal fence 
Security electric fences are electric fences constructed using specialised equipment and built for perimeter security as opposed to animal management. Security electric fences consist of wires that carry pulses of electric current to provide a non-lethal shock to deter potential intruders. Tampering with the fence also results in an alarm that is logged by the security electric fence energiser, and can also trigger a siren, strobe, or notifications to a control room or directly to the owner via email or phone.

In practical terms, security electric fences are a type of perimeter intrusion detection sensor array that act as a (or part of a) physical barrier, a psychological deterrent to potential intruders, and as part of a security alarm system.

Non-lethal electric fences are used by both private and government-sector bodies to prevent trespass. These include freight carriers, auto auctions, equipment rental companies, auto dealers, housing communities, commercial factories or warehouses, prisons, military bases, and government buildings. Many of these electric fences act as monitored security alarm systems in addition to causing an uncomfortable shock. Electrified palisade fences are used to protect isolated property and high security facilities, but also around some residential homes.

They can also be used inside a building, for example as a grid behind windows or skylights to prevent people from climbing through. They have also been used on yachts and on large ships to deter pirates.

Electric fences are occasionally employed to discourage suicide attempts on tall structures, and to reduce the incidence of graffiti and other petty crime.

Due to the high levels of crime in South Africa, it is common for residential houses to have perimeter defences, such as electric fences. Electrified palisade fences are commonly used. 

Types of security electric fences include:
 Piggyback A piggyback electric fence is mounted off the back of an existing wire or mesh fence, adding another level of security to the existing perimeter barrier. The piggyback profile is fastened to existing fence posts (e.g. pillars of a palisade fence) using rivets or screws. These are the most commonly used security electric fences.
 Wall topWall-top electric fences attach to the top of an existing perimeter barrier such as a masonry wall. These are the second most common type of security electric fences.
 Stand aloneStand-alone electric fences act as the sole perimeter barrier. This type is normally found as one of many layers of perimeter security around high security establishments, meaning that in order touch it, an intruder would have had to previously bypass at least one physical barrier.

Stun–lethal fence 
A "stun–lethal" electric fence can be set to deliver a non-fatal shock if touched once, and a fatal one if touched a second time.

12-foot-high "stun–lethal" fences have been in use for some time in many US state prisons, like those in Arizona. The Federal Department of Corrections added them in 2005 to two prisons in Coleman, Florida, and prisons in Tucson; Terre Haute, Indiana; Hazelton, West Virginia; Pine Knot, Kentucky; and Pollock, Louisiana.

A "stun–lethal" fence may also consist of two fences; one set of wires forming a conventional pulsed DC non-lethal fence, the second set (interleaved with the first) forming a 6.6kV AC lethal fence, energized when the DC fence detects an intruder. Alternatively it may consist of a single, AC or pulsed DC fence capable of running in "safe", "unsafe" or "lethal" modes by varying the DC pulse energy, AC/DC fence voltage or fence on–off duty cycle.

Lethal fence 
Electric fences designed to carry potentially lethal currents can be used for anti-personnel purposes.

In 1915, during World War I, the German occupiers of Belgium closed off the border with neutral Netherlands, using a 300 km electric fence running from Vaals to Scheldt. Germany also erected a similar fence to isolate thirteen Alsatian villages from Switzerland.

Electric fences were used to guard the concentration camps of Nazi Germany during World War II, where potentially lethal voltages and currents were employed, continuously rather than in pulses. Some prisoners used the electric barbed-wire fence to commit suicide.

During the Algerian War the French erected the electrified Morice Line.

Sections of the inner German border were lined with a 3 m (10 ft) high electric fence to deter potential defectors from East Germany. Similarly, the Czechoslovak border was lined with high electric fence during Cold War to prevent emigration from Czechoslovakia.

Electric fences are used in similar fashion at some high-security prisons and certain other installations. Typically a nonelectric fence is constructed on either side of such an installation, or the deadly current is carried out of casual reach atop a wall.

North Korea uses electric fences to seal off parts of its border with South Korea.

Other uses 

Buried electric fences (also called "invisible fences" or "electronic fences") are sometimes used to contain dogs or livestock. The buried wire radiates a weak radio signal, which is detected by a collar worn by the animal. The collar emits a warning noise near the wire, but if this is ignored, produces a mild shock. Humans and other animals are unaware of the buried line. In a similar system, the collar uses GPS signals to determine proximity to a predetermined "virtual fence" without a physical installation.

Interference and unwanted effects
Poorly-designed or badly-maintained electric fences can produce sufficient electromagnetic interference to cause problems for nearby telephone, radio, and television receptionand have been a particular problem for dial-up Internet users in some rural areas.

See also 

 Agricultural fencing
 Temporary fencing

Notes

References

External links 

 Wildlife control at Canadian Airports
 Controlling geese
 Uses in Montana
 Use in prisons

Fences
Garden features
New Zealand inventions
Perimeter security
Pest control techniques